Elburn is a village in Kane County, Illinois, United States. The population was 5,602 as of the 2010 census, up from 2,756 at the 2000 census. It is located at the intersection of Illinois Route 38 and Route 47.

Geography
Elburn is located at  (41.8940, -88.4686).

History

On May 2, 1834, William Lance arrived in the Elburn area, and soon built a home there. Shortly thereafter, a man named Henry Warne arrived and opened a stagecoach inn called the Halfway House, since it was half-way between Oregon, Illinois and Chicago.

When the Chicago and North Western Transportation Company built through the area in 1854, the stop at this site was named Blackberry Station after the Township.  The village incorporated as Elburn in 1886.

The village was originally named Blackberry Station, but was changed at the request of the railroad. The name Elburn itself derives from its originally suggested name, Melbourne, but a suggestion to shorten the name resulted in the dropping of the "M", leaving Elbourne. From there, it was shortened even further to Elburne, and then finally to Elburn.

Once largely rural, the area's population began rapidly expanding in the 1990s with the arrival of large tract home developments. In January 2006, Metra began to provide passenger rail service from Elburn to Chicago on the Union Pacific/West Line. This new station replaced Geneva as the western end-of-line making Elburn one of Chicago's farthest western suburbs. A new station was also constructed in LaFox.

Elburn's first large grocery store, a Jewel-Osco, was met in 2007 with both excitement and apprehension over its possible effects on local businesses.

Demographics

As of the 2000 United States Census, there were 2,756 people, 1,038 households, and 752 families residing in the village. The racial makeup of the village was 98.08% White, 0.11% African American, 0.15% Native American, 0.33% Asian, 0.47% from other races, and 0.87% from two or more races. Hispanic or Latino of any race were 2.14% of the population.

There were 1,038 households, out of which 40.2% had children under the age of 18 living with them, 61.5% were married couples living together, 9.0% had a female householder with no husband present, and 27.5% were non-families. 23.0% of all households were made up of individuals, and 10.0% had someone living alone who was 65 years of age or older.  The average household size was 2.65 and the average family size was 3.16.

In the village, the population was spread out, with 28.5% under the age of 18, 6.2% from 18 to 24, 36.1% from 25 to 44, 20.1% from 45 to 64, and 9.1% who were 65 years of age or older.  The median age was 34 years. For every 100 females, there were 92.5 males.  For every 100 females age 18 and over, there were 90.7 males.

The median income for a household in the village was $67,788, and the median income for a family was $79,905. Males had a median income of $51,154 versus $31,464 for females. The per capita income for the village was $26,781.  About 1.2% of families and 4.1% of the population were below the poverty line, including 2.2% of those under age 18 and 5.6% of those age 65 or over.

Neighboring cities include Batavia, Geneva, and St. Charles (referred to, as a group, as the Tri-Cities). The newly created (2007) Campton Hills also borders Elburn. Aurora, Elgin and DeKalb (home of Northern Illinois University) are other close-by places as well.

References

External links
 Village of Elburn
 Elburn Chamber of Commerce

Villages in Illinois
Populated places established in 1834
Villages in Kane County, Illinois
1834 establishments in Illinois